2-Aminothiophenol is an organosulfur compound with the formula C6H4(SH)(NH2).  It is a colorless oily solid, although impure samples can be deeply colored.  It is soluble in organic solvents and in basic water.  2-Aminothiophenol is a precursor to benzothiazoles, some of which are bioactive or are commercial dyes.  Isomers of aminothiophenols include 3-aminothiophenol and 4-aminothiophenol.

2-aminothiophenol can prepared in two steps, starting with the reaction of aniline with carbon disulfide followed by hydrolysis of the resulting mercaptobenzothiazole. It can also obtained by zinc reduction of 2-nitrobenzenesulfonyl chloride.

References

Anilines
Thiols